Zétrud-Lumay Castle is a castle located in Wallonia in the village of Zétrud-Lumay, which is part of the municipality Jodoigne, Walloon Brabant, Belgium.

See also
List of castles in Belgium

Castles in Belgium
Castles in Walloon Brabant
Jodoigne